{{family name hatnote|Citra, her Sumatran patronymic surname}}

Sonia Fergina Citra (born 27 April 1993) is an Indonesian model and beauty pageant titleholder who won Puteri Indonesia 2018. She represented her country at the Miss Universe 2018 pageant held in at IMPACT Arena, Muang Thong Thani in Nonthaburi Province, north of Bangkok, Thailand. Sonia became the sixth Indonesian, third Sumatran and the second representative of Bangka Belitung to place in the semifinals in Miss Universe history.

Early life and education

Sonia was born in Tanjung Pandan, Bangka Belitung province, to a Chinese Indonesian father Ken Prayoga and British mother, Fransiska Evelin Burtnor. on the province of Bangka Belitung Islands, Indonesia. She is the youngest of her 6 siblings. She does Muay Thai, taekwondo and capoeira.

Sonia started her career as a model in 2005, through the selection of Bangka Belitung Youth Model Faces. Prior to joining pageantry, she worked as a Digital Marketing Manager for a national distributor company in Jakarta. Sonia decided to make a breakthrough to follow her childhood dream, which is to represent her country on an international level through beauty pageant.

Sonia holds a bachelor's degree in English literature from Bina Nusantara University, Jakarta, Indonesia. She is currently finishing her master's degree in business management from PPM School of Management. On 20 November 2021, Sonia married with her boyfriend that she dated for ten years, Yoanes Naftalianto.

Advocacy and issues

Sonia is active in various social causes associated with the organization “Diberi Untuk Memberi” (Accepting for Giving). She helps in providing free food to earthquake victims, school renovation and education assistance. Sonia is also involved in environmental conservation activities related to coral reef adoption at Tanjung Kelayang Beach, Belitung. Since her crowning, Sonia has advocated for HIV awareness, Breast cancer and Cervical cancer, and also creating mental healing for the children and victims of natural calamities and disaster in Palu and Lombok.

On November 21, 2018, Sonia shared her appearance together with NCCC Indonesia (National Cervical Cancer Coalition of Indonesia) at national congress Duta Kanker Serviks - Jakarta for Indonesia Cervical Cancer Day. She also worked together with local NGO called Nara Creative to create #BeDiverseBeTolerant'' notebook, filled with her biodiversity family background and how she survived bullying at school.

Pageantry

Puteri Indonesia 2018
On March 9, 2018, Sonia represented Bangka Belitung province at Puteri Indonesia 2018 contest in which she was crowned the winner. The finale was held in Jakarta Convention Center (JCC), Jakarta. She was crowned by the outgoing predecessor of Puteri Indonesia 2017, Bunga Jelitha Ibrani of Jakarta SCR.

The finale coronation night of Puteri Indonesia 2018 was attended by the reigning Miss Universe 2017 – Demi-Leigh Nel-Peters of South Africa. The runner-ups (also her close friends) were Vania Fitryanti Herlambang (as Puteri Indonesia Lingkungan 2018) and Wilda Octaviana Situngkir (as Puteri Indonesia Pariwisata 2018). All three appeared on the magazine cover of Tatler Indonesia together with Mooryati Soedibyo.

Miss Universe 2018
On December 17, 2018, Sonia represented Indonesia at the Miss Universe 2018 contest in Bangkok, Thailand, in which she placed in the Top 20, beating 74 contestants from all around the world. She was one of the wildcards for Top 20, and the 18th semifinalist overall to be called (in random order). Sonia is the sixth Indonesian Miss Universe semifinalist in history since Artika Sari Devi (also from Bangka Belitung) first made it to the semifinals in 2005. During the show, Sonia gave a speech in the opening statements, in which the Top 20 semifinalists shared a statement on how they wanted the world to know them as a person. She said:

See also

 Puteri Indonesia 2018
 Miss Universe 2018
 Vania Fitryanti Herlambang
 Wilda Octaviana Situngkir

References

External links
 

 Official Puteri Indonesia website
 Official Miss Universe Official Website

Living people
1993 births
Puteri Indonesia winners
Miss Universe 2018 contestants
People from Belitung Regency
Indo people
Indonesian people of Chinese descent
Indonesian people of Dutch descent
Indonesian female models
Indonesian film actresses
Indonesian beauty pageant winners